Pir Muhammad Mirza (c. 1376 – 22 February 1407) was a Timurid prince and briefly succeeded as King of Timurid Empire after the death of his grandfather Timur the Lame. He was the son of Jahangir Mirza who was the actual successor to the throne but had died before his father. Next in line was Umar Shaikh Mirza I but he too died. Pir Muhammad's brother Muhammad Sultan was appointed Timur's heir, but he had succumbed to battle-wounds in 1403. This left Shah Rukh, whom Timur considered too meek to rule and Miran Shah who suffered from mental difficulties post head trauma. Timur felt that none of his sons were capable of ruling so he named Pir Muhammad as his successor.

Pir Muhammad had been Governor of Kandahar since 1392. His territory extended from the lands west of the Hindu Kush to the Indus River. In the fall of 1397 he led the first wave of Timurids into India, and was invested with the rulership of Multan. However, none of Pir Muhammad's relatives supported him following Timur's death. He was unable to assume command in Samarkand. He went into battle twice against Khalil Sultan a cousin and the other claimant to the throne but was defeated. He was allowed to remain in his lands. However, six months later he was murdered by his vizier Pir Ali Taz in 1407.

References

1374 births
1407 deaths
Timurid monarchs
Timurid dynasty